The VCU Rams men's soccer team represents Virginia Commonwealth University in all NCAA Division I men's soccer competitions. In 1978, VCU has fielded a varsity men's soccer program. The Rams currently compete in the Colonial Athletic Association. 

Below is a list of records against fellow college soccer teams the Rams have played against.

Key

Results

References 
General
 
Footnotes

Results